"The Color of Friendship" is a 1981 episode of the American television anthology series ABC Afterschool Special. It is about the friendship between two 13-year-old boys, one black and one white, in a small town that has just started integrating its schools.

Plot
David Bellinger is a middle-class white teenager living in the fictitious city of Marston.  Joel Garth is a poor black teenager from the infamous "center" of the city, a depressed, crime-ridden area.  David's school is targeted for integration by busing students from "the center" to David's more affluent neighborhood.

Cast
 Chris Barnes - David Bellinger
 Katharine Houghton - Miss James
 James Bond III - Joel Garth

Awards
Won Best Children's Special or Episode in a Series award in 1982.

References

External links
 

1981 American television episodes
ABC Afterschool Special episodes